Romeo Engineering and Technology Center is located in northern Macomb County, Michigan approximately 30 miles north of the city of Detroit.  Romeo Engineering and Technology Center also known as RETC and is a satellite school of Romeo High School. The RETC was built and completed in 2003, originally the plan was to create a new separate school however funding failed so the decision was made to build a satellite school to reduce overcrowding at the main high school. The RETC has an area of 90,288 sq.ft., covers 77 acres, and cost $12,259,836 to build.  The RETC offers Technology, advanced math and science programs, as well as most career programs.  Students who wish to attend the RETC are bussed from the High School or drive to the school. Recently the school has installed solar panels across the roof, the project was completed in and turned on in December 2010. The solar panels were paid for by grants and can produce upwards of 19.8 Kilowatts (DC).

Incidents
The RETC has encountered several incidents since being built in 2003. Three bomb threats were made against the school, one on October 10, 2007, during the week of homecoming, another a few weeks later on October 25, 2007, and the other in December 2007.  The first incident occurred on October 10 when a bomb threat was written in the bathroom stalls stating that the school would blow up on October 12. A note was sent home to parents describing the situation and that it was optional for students to attend that day.  As a precaution, backpacks and big purses were not allowed into the school and students were searched when entering.  Earlier that morning the premises was searched by Macomb County Sheriff and their K-9 bomb sniffing dogs.  The students homecoming pep assembly and dance were not cancelled; however, many precautions were in place such as purses, bags, and jackets were not allowed into several events and police presence was high at the events as well.   The second event happened on October 25, when students tried to place a bomb threat through a pre-paid phone by calling the Romeo Police Department, the phone was tracked and the students were arrested. On the morning of December 7, 2007, a third bomb threat was found written on the walls of Romeo High School, stating that the RETC had a bomb inside, The buildings were evacuated until deemed safe by the Macomb County Sheriff. None of the threats proved to follow through and a bomb was never found in any case.

On February 24, 2010, a school bus parked outside RETC caught fire.  The bus was originally set to bus students from the RETC to the high school as usual; however, the bus wouldn't start up properly and had a warning light.  The students left the RETC on other buses and shortly after at around 2:15 PM the bus caught fire.  No students were on the bus at the time and the bus driver made it off the bus without any injuries.  The cause of the fire was determined to be an electrical fire. 

On March 23, 2012, a student notified the high school office that a student was seen with a gun during the RETC passing time.  Both the high school and the RETC went into immediate lock-down.  Both schools were swept by the Macomb County Sheriff and Michigan State Police, no gun was found in the hallways or lockers so students were searched upon leaving the RETC at the end of the day.  The student who made the claim told the office which student he believed had the weapon; the student was searched and no gun was found.  The student who made the claim revoked his statement, saying it was false. The lockdown at the high school was lifted after the student stated his statement was false.  The student faces heavy legal action and prosecution from the school district.

On October 30, 2012 at 10:35 a.m., winds from hurricane Sandy gusted at speeds of 50 MPH and caused RETC to temporarily lose power before switching over to the back-up generator.  Power was restored later on that day.

On April 18, 2013 at approximately 11:30 a.m., a minor electrical problem triggered the back-up generator to turn on and triggered the fire alarms to go off. The school was evacuated and the fire department was called to check out the building. The problem was corrected and students were allowed back into the building.

In January 2016, the RETC was evacuated to Powell Middle School due to a burst water pipe.

Activities and clubs
Most activities and clubs are located at the high school, however several are located at the RETC including:
DECA: DECA is a business related competition.
Business Professionals of America:  BPA is related with Business classes taught at the RETC.

Pictures

Adjacent high schools

References

External links
 School Homepage
 Byting Bulldogs

Schools in Macomb County, Michigan
High schools in Michigan
2003 establishments in Michigan